This is a list of women photographers who were born in China or whose works are closely associated with that country.

C
 Chen Man (born 1980), fashion photographer using digital techniques to produce covers for Chinese and international magazines
 Cui Xiuwen (1967–2018), artist producing paintings, videos and photographs

G
 Guo Yingguang (born 1983), projects involving videos and photographs

H
 Hou Bo (1924–2017), portraits (and less formal photographs) of leading officials including Mao Zedong and the founding of the People's Republic in 1949

L
Yushi Li (born 1991), Chinese-born, London-based photographer whose work is concerned with the male gaze and the female gaze
Yijun Liao (active since 2008), also known as Pixy Liao, Chinese fine art photographer based in New York
Liu Xia (born 1961), wife of the Nobel Prize winner Liu Xiaobo, poet, painter, photographer

P
Joey Pang (born 1979), tattoo artist inspired by Chinese art

S
 Shao Hua (1938–2008), daughter-in-law of Mao Zedong, photographed party celebrities, factories and army units in the 1950s, head of the China Photographers Association

T
Tang Ying Chi (born 1956), Hong Kong visual artist, creates paintings from her digital photographs
Tian Yuan (born 1985), singer, actress, writer, photographer

W
Xiao Hui Wang (fl 1990s), photography, film and television projects
Wong Wo Bik (active since 1980s), fine arts photographer, based in Hong Kong

X 

 Xiao Zhuang (born 1933), photojournalist and photo-editor.
 Xing Danwen (born 1967), contemporary artist and photographer

Y
Luo Yang (born 1984), photographer of women

Z

 Zhang Jingna (born 1988), now in Singapore, professional photographer for companies including Mercedes Benz and Canon, has also contributed to Harper's Bazaar, Elle and Flare
 O Zhang (born 1976), photographs of Chinese youth including Chinese girls adopted by Americans and Chinese art students in London
Zhu Lan Qing (born 1991), artistic photographer, based in Taipei

-
Chinese women photographers, List of
Photographers
Photographers